Evergreen Marine Corporation is a Taiwanese container transportation and shipping company that is headquartered in Luzhu District, Taoyuan City, Taiwan. With over 150 container ships, it is part of the Evergreen Group conglomerate of transportation firms and associated companies.

Overview

Evergreen calls on 240 ports worldwide in about 80 countries, and is the sixth largest company of in the shipping industry. 

Its principal trading routes are East Asia to North America, Central America and the Caribbean; East Asia to the Mediterranean and northern Europe; Europe to the east coast of North America; East Asia to Australia; East Asia to eastern and southern Africa; East Asia to South America; and an intra Asia service linking ports in East Asia to the Persian Gulf and the Red Sea. 

The company's activities include: shipping, construction of containers and ships, management of ports, engineering and real estate development. Subsidiaries and divisions include Uniglory Marine Corp. (Taiwan), Evergreen UK Ltd. (UK), and shipping company Italia Marittima S.p.A. (Italy).

In 2007, Hatsu, Italia Marittima, and Evergreen were merged into the single "Evergreen Line."

The majority of Evergreen's shipping containers are painted green with the word "Evergreen" placed on the sides in white letters.  Uniglory containers are similarly painted and marked, but those containers are bright orange.  Evergreen's refrigerated "reefer" containers have a reverse color scheme (white containers with green lettering).

History 
The company was founded 1 September 1968 by Yung-Fa Chang. Services began with a single cargo vessel named Central Trust, which operated a "go-anywhere" service. A second vessel was added in 1969, and used on Middle East services.  Additional vessels were acquired through the 1970s, and routes to East Asia and Central America were added.  Service to the U.S. began in 1974, with the establishment of Evergreen Marine Corporation (New York) Ltd.

In 1981, the parent company changed its name to Evergreen International S.A. (EIS), as the company increased its global expansion efforts. Evergreen Marine began its first circumnavigation shipping services in 1984.  This service is bi-directional, covering both westbound and eastbound routings.

In 1992, almost 29,000 rubber ducks called "Friendly Floatees" were unintentionally dumped into the Pacific Ocean from a container lost overboard by the Evergreen ship Ever Laurel.

Since then, Evergreen Marine has expanded to include other shipping companies such as the Uniglory Marine Corp. (Taiwan) in 1984, the Hatsu Marine Ltd. (U.K.) in 2002, and the Italian shipping company Italia Marittima (previously Lloyd Triestino, and founded as "Österreichischer Lloyd" in 1835) in 1993.  Uniglory was made a division of the company in 1999. Evergreen Marine has also become a partner of EVA Airways, founded in 1989, and Uni Air, founded in 1998.

In 2002, Evergreen Marine operated 61 container vessels, with a total fleet size totaling 130 vessels with 400,000 TEU (twenty-foot equivalent units). By 2008, Evergreen Marine operated 178 container vessels. In 2009, the company announced plans to build 100 additional vessels, in anticipation of a global economic recovery by 2012.

Leadership 
Everport Terminal Services (ETS)

Eric Wang - Chairman

Ron Neal - President

Denis Delgado - Senior Vice President

Brandon Olivas - Vice President/General Manager

Accidents and incidents

Ever Summit
In January 2019, the Ever Summit crashed into a crane. There was no death or injuries.

Ever Given 

On 23 March 2021, the container ship Ever Given became stuck in the Suez Canal, leading to a significant impediment in marine shipping world-wide. After nearly a week, tugboats and heavy machinery managed to re-float and free the ship.

Ever Forward 
On 13 March 2022, the container ship Ever Forward ran aground in the Chesapeake Bay, near Baltimore, Maryland. The ship left the dredged navigation channel and became stuck. On 31 March 2022, Evergreen declared General Average after two attempts to refloat the vessel had failed. Containers were removed from the ship to lighten the load, and dredging was also underway to allow the ship to be freed. On the morning of 17 April, coinciding with the rising tide, the vessel was finally refloated.

Operations

Evergreen Marine's operations primarily center around five general routings:
East Asia to North America/Central America
East Asia to Northern Europe/Mediterranean
Europe to North America (transatlantic)
East Asia to Southern Hemisphere (intercontinental)
Intra-Asia
The shipping line's busiest routings are in the first category, East Asia to North America and Central America. Within this area, common traffic is between Taiwan, Japan, Korea, and China with the U.S. West Coast, along with routings to the East Caribbean via Panama.

Terminals 
Evergreen Marine operates four major transshipment hubs, and multiple container terminals.

Transshipment hubs
 Taichung Container Terminal, Taiwan
 Kaohsiung Container Terminal, Taiwan
 Colon Container Terminal, Panama

Terminals
 EverPort Terminal Services (ETS) Los Angeles, California
 EverPort Terminal Services (ETS) Tacoma, Washington
 EverPort Terminal Services (ETS) Oakland, California
 Evergreen terminals in Asia, (e.g. Thailand), Europe (e.g. Italy), and elsewhere
 Evergreen terminals in Middle East, North Yard Company

Subsidiaries and divisions

Maritime lines
Since 2007, the following have been merged into the single Evergreen Line.
 Uniglory Marine Corp. (Taiwan)
 Evergreen UK Ltd. (UK)
 Italia Marittima S.p.A. (Italy)

Service network

Evergreen Marine's worldwide service network is handled through the following agencies:

 Evergreen Marine Corp. (Taiwan) Ltd.
 Evergreen Korea Corp.
 Evergreen Marine Corp. (Malaysia) Sdn Bhd.
 Evergreen Shipping(Singapore) Pte Ltd.
 Evergreen Shipping Agency (Thailand) Co. Ltd.
 P.T. Evergreen Shipping Agency Indonesia ee'
 Evergreen Vietnam Corp.
 Evergreen Japan Corp.
 Evergreen Marine (Hong Kong) Ltd.
 Evergreen Philippines Corp.
 Evergreen India Private Ltd.
 Evergreen International S.A. / Unigreen Marine S.A.
 Evergreen Shipping Agency (America) Corp.
 Evergreen Shipping Agency (Russia) Ltd.
 Evergreen Marine Australia Pty Ltd.
 Evergreen Shipping Spain
 Evergreen France S.A.
 Evergreen Shipping Agency (Netherlands) B.V.
 Evergreen Deutschland GmbH
 Evergreen Shipping Agency (Poland) Sp. Z o.o.
 Evergreen Gesellschaft M.B.H.
 Evergreen Marine (UK) Ltd.
 Evergreen Agency (Ireland) Ltd.
 Evergreen Shipping Agency (Italy) S.p.A.
 Green Andes (Chile)
 Global Shipping Agencies (Colombia)
 Baridhi Shipping Lines Ltd (Bangladesh)

Fleet 
In total, Evergreen Marine operated 178 container ships in 2008.

The following are vessels transferred between Evergreen Marine and Uniglory Marine (Taiwanese or Panamanian flag) and subsidiaries:
Lloyd Triestino / Italy (ship name begins with pre-fix "LT", since 2006 with "Ital
Evergreen UK Ltd. / UK (ship name begins with pre-fix "Ever"): Hatsu Marine was renamed Evergreen UK (previously, Evergreen UK ships, as Hatsu ships, were prefixed with the word "Hatsu", for example, the Hatsu Sigma is now known as the Ever Sigma.)
Some vessels delivered as new buildings to these subsidiaries.

See also

 Chang Yung-fa
 Ever Given
 Evergreen Group
 Italia Marittima
 List of companies of Taiwan
 List of largest container shipping companies
 Evergreen Maritime Museum
 EVA Air
 Maritime industries of Taiwan
 Transportation in Taiwan
 2021 Suez Canal obstruction

References

External links

 Evergreen Marine—official website
 長榮海運—official website (Mandarin)

Transport companies established in 1968
Port operating companies
Companies listed on the Taiwan Stock Exchange
Companies based in Taoyuan City
Container shipping companies
Shipping companies of Taiwan
Multinational companies headquartered in Taiwan
Taiwanese brands
Evergreen Group
1968 establishments in Taiwan